Dudderidge is a surname. Notable people with the surname include:

John Dudderidge (1906–2004), English canoeist
Phil Dudderidge (born 1949), English sound engineer

See also
 Duddridge